Borgsdorf (in German Bahnhof Borgsdorf) is a railway station in the village of Borgsdorf (town Hohen Neuendorf), Brandenburg, Germany. It is served by the Berlin S-Bahn. There is also a connection to local bus service.

References

External links
Station information 

Berlin S-Bahn stations
Railway stations in Brandenburg
Buildings and structures in Oberhavel